The Giles family is a fictional British family created by cartoonist Carl Giles at the end of World War II, appearing first on 5 August 1945.
Much of Giles's World War II work had been cartoons featuring Adolf Hitler, Benito Mussolini and the typical British Tommy, but he felt the need to expand after the War, hence the family. The format was a single-panel cartoon, published daily in the Daily Express and Sunday Express newspapers from 1945 until 1991. An annual collection was published each Christmas.

Characterisation
The family belongs to the better-off British working class and is usually seen living in a semi-detached house. The scenes in which they are depicted usually comment on a topic headlining the news of the day. The Giles family is patriotic but suspicious of authority. The ages of the family members remained the same throughout the 46-year run of the cartoon series, but their home, their hobbies and their dress reflected the changing British fashions and standard of living.

The Giles family consists of the following:
 Grandma, the most distinctive character of the series. Always present but rarely given a direct voice. She is the ultimate head of the family (despite what Father may think). She is seen using such things as skis, a motorbike, a hang glider, a Sinclair C5, and playing the tuba. A proper battle-axe of a woman, who is crossed at one's peril.
 Father, Grandma's son. A mild and philosophical character. Still deludedly regards himself as the head of the family. He works, but it's never revealed where. He is passionate about boats, football, racing, fishing, betting, and hiding from the younger, louder family members. Would do anything for a quiet life and is often seen lounging in the garden.
 Mother, Organises everyone else and cheerfully tackles endless housework and mountains of cooking for the extended Giles family.
 George, Mother and Father's elder son, is an avid reader and is very rarely seen without a book in his hands. Smokes a Sherlock Holmes style pipe and wears a beret and sandals. Absent in later cartoons. He is married to the skinny bespectacled Vera who constantly suffers from a cold. They have one baby son, George Jr.
 Ann, the eldest daughter, and her babies, the twins, Lawrence and Ralph. The twins' absent father is a G.I.
 Carol, blonde daughter, always seen lounging about reading magazines.
 Ernie, the younger son. A smaller version of Father in looks and attitude, but with a child's cheekiness.
 Bridget, the youngest daughter. Wears a gymslip and has never been in any trouble because she never gets caught.
 Grandma's Parrot, called Attila the Hun.
 Butch the dog, a shaggy Airedale terrier.
 Second dog, a Border collie.
 Natalie, a black cat.
 Larry (aka "Stinker"), the mop-haired kid from next door. When not up to mischief he can be seen with a camera recording the mischief or embarrassing situations involving others.
 Chalkie the schoolmaster, a humourless walking skeleton of a man. Modelled on one of Giles's own teachers.
 Vera, perpetually ill.

Cultural legacy

There is a statue of Grandma in Queen Street in Ipswich, England where she stands looking up at the newspaper office window where Carl Giles used to work. Grandma made a cameo appearance in DC Comics' Superman: True Brit and Alan Moore's League of Extraordinary Gentlemen: Black Dossier. The appearance of Mrs. Henriot-Gulch in the comic Cerebus is closely based on Grandma.

In the 1980s the family appeared in television cartoon advertisements for Lyons Quick Brew tea, one of which included Grandma racing around on her motorbike.

References

Sources
Carl Giles Biography British Cartoon Archive, University of Kent. Accessed April 2008.

External links
 The Giles Family (Not working 28.08.2012)
 Giles cartoon database

British comic strips
Comics characters introduced in 1945
1945 comics debuts
1991 comics endings
British comics characters
Fictional families
Comics about married people
Gag-a-day comics
Gag cartoon comics
Comics set in the United Kingdom
Daily Express